Colie McDonagh (born 1945 in Carraroe, County Galway) is an Irish former sportsperson. He played Gaelic football with his local club Fr. Griffin's and was a member of the Galway senior inter-county team in the 1960s and 1970s.

References

1945 births
Living people
Fr. Griffin's Gaelic footballers
Galway inter-county Gaelic footballers
Irish schoolteachers